The 2002 Norwegian Football Cup Final was the final match of the 2002 Norwegian Football Cup, the 97th season of the Norwegian Football Cup, the premier Norwegian football cup competition organized by the Football Association of Norway (NFF). The match was played on 3 November 2002 at the Ullevaal Stadion in Oslo, and opposed two Tippeligaen sides Odd Grenland and Vålerenga. Vålerenga defeated Odd Grenland 1–0 to claim the Norwegian Cup for a third time in their history.

Route to the final

Match

Details

References

2002
Norwegian Football Cup Final, 2002
Vålerenga Fotball matches
Odds BK matches
Football Cup
Norwegian Football Cup Final
Sports competitions in Oslo
Norwegian Football Cup Final, 2002